Beyg Kandi (also Romanized as Beyg Kandī; also known as Beyk Kandī) is a village in Avajiq-e Shomali Rural District, Dashtaki District, Chaldoran County, West Azerbaijan Province, Iran. At the 2006 census, its population was 470, in 96 families.

References 

Populated places in Chaldoran County